Casti connubii (Latin: "of chaste wedlock") is a papal encyclical promulgated by Pope Pius XI on 31 December 1930 in response to the Lambeth Conference of the Anglican Communion.  It stressed the sanctity of marriage, prohibited Catholics from using any form of artificial birth control, and reaffirmed the prohibition on abortion. It also explained the authority of church doctrine on moral matters, and advocated that civil governments follow the lead of the church in this area.

Topics
Casti connubii was a response to the Lambeth Conference of 1930 in which the Anglican Communion approved the use of birth control in limited circumstances. It covered four major topics: the sanctity of marriage, opposition to eugenics, positions on birth control and the purpose of sexuality, and reaffirmation of the prohibition on abortion.

Sanctity of marriage
Pope Pius XI's encyclical references and confirms Arcanum (1880) on Christian marriage by Pope Leo XIII.
Catholic doctrine has always considered matrimony to be a most holy state of life for those called to the married life (Thomas Aquinas Summa Theologica; Augustine of Hippo On the Goods of Marriage). This encyclical reaffirms that marriage is a sacrament, and a means to sanctifying grace.

The encyclical also affirms the church's opposition to adultery and divorce, and its support of wives as homemakers. It calls for wives to be obedient to their husbands, while commanding husbands to love their wives as "Christ loved His Church".

This ... does not deny or take away the liberty which fully belongs to the woman both in view of her dignity as a human person, and in view of her most noble office as wife and mother and companion; nor does it bid her obey her husband's every request if not in harmony with right reason or with the dignity due to wife; ... For if the man is the head, the woman is the heart, and as he occupies the chief place in ruling, so she may and ought to claim for herself the chief place in love.

Opposition to eugenics
Casti connubii speaks out against the eugenics laws, then popular, that forbade those deemed 'unfit' from marrying and having children: "Those who act in this way are at fault in losing sight of the fact that the family is more sacred than the State and that men are begotten not for the earth and for time, but for Heaven and eternity."

It also took a strong stand against forced sterilizations. Pius XI stated that if no crime has taken place and there is no cause present for grave punishment, magistrates have no direct power over the bodies of their subjects. He cited Thomas Aquinas:
St. Thomas teaches this when inquiring whether human judges for the sake of preventing future evils can inflict punishment, he admits that the power indeed exists as regards certain other forms of evil, but justly and properly denies it as regards the maiming of the body.

Birth control and the purpose of sexuality
Prior to this encyclical, it was believed by some Catholics that the only licit reason for sexual intercourse was an attempt to create children.   At the time, there was no official church position on any non-procreative purposes of intercourse. Casti connubii does repeat several times that the conjugal act is intrinsically tied with procreation:

However, Casti connubii also acknowledges the unitive aspect of intercourse as licit:

Casti connubii also reaffirms the dignity of the human conjugal act as distinct from the conjugal acts of animals, by its volitive nature; that is, the act is not merely biological
but rooted in the will and therefore a personal act.

The 'natural reasons of time or of certain defects' are universally accepted as meaning menopause and infertility. This paragraph thus means menopausal and infertile couples may morally engage in intercourse, even though there is no possibility of children resulting from the act.

The 'natural reasons of time' is interpreted by some to also mean the infertile portion 
of a woman's menstrual cycle.  The practice of avoiding pregnancy by abstaining from sexual relations when the woman is fertile (natural family planning) was first addressed in rulings by the Sacred Penitentiary in 1853 and 1880, which declared the practice moral.  However, a few Catholic theologians continued to hold that such practices were equivalent
to contraception and thus immoral, and some historians consider two 1951 speeches by Pope Pius XII to be the first explicit church acceptance of natural family planning. The church's view of contraception was explored further in the 1968 encyclical Humanae vitae by Pope Paul VI, and by Pope John Paul II's lecture series later entitled Theology of the Body.

Abortion
This encyclical repeats the church's condemnation of abortion in all circumstances. It also draws a connection between contracepting couples and couples that have abortions: "... those wicked parents who seek to remain childless, and failing in this, are not ashamed to put their offspring to death."

Reactions and impact
In a 1932 article published in The Nation, Margaret Sanger gave her personal reaction to the encyclical, saying that it was an obstacle to general approval of the birth-control movement by political leaders unwilling to oppose the leadership of the church. She also asserts that it is "not in accord with science and definitely against social welfare and race improvement".

Casti connubii is most noted for its anti-contraception position. Unlike major Protestant denominations, the Catholic Church has continued its opposition to artificial birth control. This encyclical, along with Humanae vitae, has come to represent that stance.

References

Bibliography
 

Documents of Pope Pius XI
Papal encyclicals
Catholic theology of the body
1930 in Christianity
1930 documents
December 1930 events